Sanjay Surinder Kapoor (born 17 October 1965) is an Indian actor and film producer. He works in Hindi cinema, Indian television and web series. He is a member of the Surinder Kapoor family. Kapoor is the founder and director of Sanjay Kapoor Entertainment Private Limited.

Early life and background 
Kapoor was born to Nirmal Kapoor and film producer Surinder Kapoor. He has three older siblings Boney Kapoor, Anil Kapoor and Reena Marwah. Actors Sonam Kapoor, Arjun Kapoor, Janhvi Kapoor, Mohit Marwah and Harshvardhan Kapoor, and film producer Rhea Kapoor are his nephews and nieces. The Kapoor family of Prithviraj Kapoor are also his distant relatives as Prithviraj Kapoor was his father's cousin.

Career

Film career and few successes (1995–present) 
Kapoor made his debut in Hindi cinema in 1995 with the movie Prem, opposite newcomer Tabu. Although both debutants rendered fairly decent performances, the movie was delayed for many years as it was in production since 1989. On release, it bombed at the box office. Kapoor's next movie was Raja (1995) opposite Madhuri Dixit which was a box office success. He went on to star in several films as a lead actor such as Auzaar (1997), Mohabbat (1997) and Sirf Tum (1999). Apart from the moderately successful Chhupa Rustam: A Musical Thriller (2001) he didn't have much success as a lead actor as most of his films failed at the box office. In 2002, he appeared as a villain playing the psychotic husband of Esha Deol in Koi Mere Dil Se Poochhe. His performance was praised by critics.

He started playing supporting roles in films like Qayamat: City Under Threat (2003), Julie (2004), Luck By Chance (2009) and Shaandaar (2015).

He turned to producing with his first production Tevar starring his nephew Arjun Kapoor releasing in 2015. He played a cameo appearing alongside his brother Anil for the first time in Mubarakan (2017).

In early 2018, Sanjay was cast in the anthology film  Lust Stories as a lead character opposite actress Manisha Koirala. In the same year, he was cast in the movie "The Zoya Factor" as his real life niece Sonam Kapoor's on screen father, and Kannada film "Seetharama Kalyana". In 2020, he appeared in a short film "Sleeping Partner" opposite actress Divya Dutta.

Television and web career (2003–present) 
He made his debut on television in 2003 appearing in the television serial Karishma – The Miracles of Destiny opposite Karisma Kapoor.

In 2017, he was cast in Vikram Bhatt's television serial Dil Sambhal Jaa Zara opposite Smriti Kalra. The show is about a man marrying a girl much younger than him and how they try to make their marriage work.  He even landed a role in ALTBalaji's web series Soggy Hoga Tera Baap as Chiraag Arora.  He has also been cast in the TV film "Fashion Street" as Sanjay Thakur. In 2020, he appeared in The Gone Game as Rajeev Gujral.

He then appeared in The Last Hour in 2021, as DCP Arup Singh. In 2022, he appeared in the Netflix web show The Fame Game as Nikhil More, opposite Madhuri Dixit.

Personal life 

He married his longtime girlfriend and former actress Maheep Sandhu in 1997. The couple have two children, Shanaya and Jahaan Kapoor. His daughter, Shanaya, is all set to make her debut, as an actress, with Dharma Productions' Bedhadak, directed by Shashank Khaitan.

Filmography

Films

Television

Producer

References

External links 

 
 

1965 births
Living people
Indian male film actors
Indian male soap opera actors
Male actors in Hindi cinema
Punjabi people
Male actors from Mumbai
20th-century Indian male actors
21st-century Indian male actors